The following is a list of software that uses Subversion, a revision control system used in software development.

 SubversionEdge, a web-based front-end for Subversion.
 TeamForge, distributed agile application lifecycle management software.
 TortoiseSVN, an extension for Microsoft Explorer.
 SnailSVN, a Mac OS X GUI client with Finder integration.
 VisualSVN Server, a commercial and proprietary Subversion server package for Windows operating system.
 Mindquarry, open-source collaborative software geared towards small and medium-sized workgroups.
 Polarion ALM for Subversion - web based application lifecycle management platform.
 RapidSVN, a visual subversion client.
 SharpForge, a project management and bug-tracking web application.
 SVK, a distributed revision control system.
 svnX, an open-source GUI client for Mac OS X.
 Versions, a Mac OS X GUI client.
 Cornerstone, a Mac OS X GUI client.
 RabbitVCS, an extension for GNOME's Nautilus file manager and gedit text editor.
 Agilo for Trac, a web-based Scrum tool.
 SVN Repo Browser Pro, an iPhone and iPad client.
 BugBranch, an iPhone and iPad client.
 Subdivision, a commercial GUI tool for managing Subversion repositories.

Integrated Development Environments
The following Integrated Development Environments (IDEs) support - or can be integrated with - Subversion:
 Coda — As of version 1.5, Coda has integrated Subversion support
 SlickEdit
 Xcode — Apple's Mac OS X IDE
 Microsoft Visual Studio, using the following add-ins: Agent SVN, plug-in that allows Subversion to integrate with Visual Studio; AnkhSVN, a Visual Studio .NET add-on, which allows one to perform the most common Subversion operations from directly inside the VS.NET IDE; VisualSVN, a Subversion integration for Visual Studio 2003-2017; PushOk SVN SCC PlugIn, another Visual Studio addin.
 Borland Delphi/Embarcadero RAD Studio, through the DelphiSVN plug-in.
 Eclipse, through the following environments/plug-ins: Aptana; Subclipse, an open source project that integrates Subversion into Eclipse IDE, Subversive, an Eclipse project aimed at providing Subversion support in Eclipse (this plug-in is the EasyEclipse bundle).
 Zend Studio
 KDevelop
 Emacs
TeXstudio 
 Vim
 NetBeans
 JDeveloper
 phpDesigner Qt Creator
 Eric Python IDE
 ActiveState Komodo
 BBEdit, a Mac OS X-based text editor.
 UEStudio, a lightweight IDE
 SharpDevelop, a free IDE for C#, VB.NET and Boo projects on Microsoft's .NET platform.
 TextMate, an extensible editor for Mac OS X
 Dreamweaver version CS4 now includes support for Subversion (previous versions did not support Subversion). Also, Subweaver'' is a Dreamweaver extension that integrates SVN commands by interacting with a TortoiseSVN installation
 BlueJ
 CoDeSys, an IDE for IEC-61131 programming languages has an optional, non-free Subversion integration plugin.

References

See also
Comparison of Subversion clients

Apache Subversion
Subversion